The South American snapping turtle (Chelydra acutirostris) is a species of turtle in the family Chelydridae. This species, which is endemic to 
Central and northwestern South America, was previously considered a subspecies of Chelydra serpentina. Its restricted range in South America reflects its recent arrival there as part of the Great American Interchange.

Geographic range
Chelydra acutirostris is found in Honduras, Nicaragua, Costa Rica, Panama, Colombia and Ecuador.

Subspecies
There are no recognized subspecies of C. acutirostris.

References

Bibliography

Further reading
Peters W (1862). "Über einen neuen Phyllodactylus aus Guayaquil ". Monatsberichte der Königlichen Preussischen Akademie der Wissenschaften zu Berlin 1862: 626–627. ("Chelydra serpentina var. acutirostris ", new variety, p. 627). (in German and Latin).

Chelydra
Turtles of North America
Turtles of South America
turtle, So Am Snap
Reptiles of Colombia
Reptiles of Costa Rica
Reptiles of Ecuador
Reptiles of Honduras
Reptiles of Panama
Reptiles of Nicaragua
Reptiles described in 1862
Taxa named by Wilhelm Peters